Arclinea, also known as Arclinea Arredamenti Spa, is an Italian design company. It was founded in Caldogno, Italy in 1925 by Silvio Fortuna, as a carpentry shop: Silvio resumed the business started by his great-grandfather in 1816 and interrupted a century later by the war.
The company change its name from "Ditta Silvio Fortuna, lavorazione meccanica del legno" to "Arclinea Cucine Componibili" in the 1960 and it began to focus exclusively on kitchen cabinetry in 1960. At that point, the firm began crafting cabinetry specifically designed to hold appliances, which had typically been considered a separate kitchen design element. This led to a more sleek, streamlined appearance for the kitchen. Angelo, Almerindo and Lena, Silvio's sons, joined the company too.

In the 70's the third Fortuna generation joined the company with the entry of Silvio, Walter, Marillina and Gianni.

The company successfully introduced several modular kitchen designs into the marketplace during the 1960s and 1970s, working with a variety of European designers as Lucci & Orlandini, Carlo Bartoli, Ettore Sottsass e Associati, Roberto Pamio, Enzo Berti. In 1987, Arclinea partnered with Italian architect Antonio Citterio, that designed and coordinated various kitchen models.

Arclinea has been recognized with numerous awards, including Italy's highest design award, the Compasso d'Oro, and the 2004 Elle Decor Designer of the Year Award. Arclinea has also expanded beyond Italy, with locations in Europe, Asia, Australia, and North and South America. Its first standalone U.S. showroom opened in Boston in 2001, although the product was previously sold in Chicago. 

At today Arclinea is still owned and managed by the Fortuna family: in the 2010 with Federico, grandson of Angelo, the fourth generation joined the company.

See also 

List of Italian companies

References
 
 WSJ

External links
 Homepage
 Arclinea Spain
 Arclinea Espacio Cocina en Vivo (Spain)

Design companies of Italy
Furniture companies of Italy
Companies based in Veneto
Design companies established in 1925
Manufacturing companies established in 1925
Italian companies established in 1925
Italian brands